Notoreas perornata is a species of moth in the family Geometridae. It is endemic to New Zealand.

Taxonomy
This species was first described in 1863 by Francis Walker using material collected in either Hawkes Bay or Taupo by William Colenso and named Fidonia perornata. In 1884 Meyrick placed this species within the genus Pasithea. In 1886 Meyrick renamed the genus to which he had previously assigned this species and placed it within the genus Notoreas. George Hudson discussed and illustrated this species both in his 1898 book New Zealand Moths and Butterflies (Macro-lepidoptera) using the name Notoreas perornata and again in his 1928 book The Butterflies and Moths of New Zealand. In the later case Hudson followed Louis Beethoven Prout and used the name Lythria perornata. John S. Dugdale regarded the 1898 illustrations as not a good match but approved of the illustration done by Hudson in 1928. The genus Notoreas was reviewed in 1986 by R. C. Craw and the placement of this species within it was confirmed.

In 2010 Brian Patrick, Robert Hoare and Birgit Rhode studied this species and others in its complex and discussed the taxonomy of the species. However species within the genus Notoreas are currently regarded as being in need of revision and in particular this species is regarded as needing more taxonomic work. The holotype specimen is held at the Natural History Museum, London.

Description
Walker originally described the species as follows:

Distribution
N. perornata is endemic to New Zealand. This species is found in the North Island from Northland to Westland and in the South Island on the coast in Marlborough.

Life cycle and behaviour

The female moth lays her eggs within the flower buds of their host plant. When the larvae emerge from their eggs, they eat into the leaves or buds of their host, hiding from predators. Once they are large enough, they emerge to feed from the fresh growth of the plant. N. perornata pupate in a loose cocoon on the ground under their host. N. perornata has two generations each year with adults on the wing in the months of October to November and March to April. However, in the northern parts of New Zealand this species may be multivoltine. N. perornata are day-flying moths. They are low but fast flyers and constantly vibrate their wings to enable them to take off rapidly.

Host species
The host plants for the larvae of N. perornata are endemic species of Pimelea.

References

Larentiinae
Moths described in 1863
Moths of New Zealand
Endemic fauna of New Zealand
Taxa named by Francis Walker (entomologist)
Endemic moths of New Zealand